Alain Lemaitre Sendel (born 14 October 1968) is a Mexican former professional tennis player.

Born in 1968, Lemaitre is the son of journalist Virginia Sendel and tennis player Yves Lemaitre, who coached Rafael Osuna. His brother, also named Yves, played on the professional tour. On his mother's side, he is the grandson of Mexican actress Rebeca Iturbide as well as the grandson of Davis Cup player Federico Sendel.

Lemaitre reached a best singles world ranking of 344, competing in Wimbledon qualifying and as high up as the ATP Challenger Tour. He was a singles quarter-finalist and doubles champion at the 1989 Bogota Challenger.

ATP Challenger finals

Doubles: 1 (1–0)

References

External links
 
 

1968 births
Living people
Mexican male tennis players
20th-century Mexican people